Out of the West is a 1926 American silent Western film directed by Robert De Lacey and written by Wyndham Gittens. The film stars Tom Tyler, Bernice Welch, L.J. O'Connor, Ethan Laidlaw, Alfred Hewston and Frankie Darro. The film was released on September 26, 1926, by Film Booking Offices of America.

Cast      
 Tom Tyler as Tom Hanley
 Bernice Welch as Bernice O'Connor
 L.J. O'Connor as Jim Rollins
 Ethan Laidlaw as Bide Goodrich
 Alfred Hewston as John O'Connor
 Frankie Darro as Frankie O'Connor
 Gertrude Claire as 'Grannie' Hanley
 Barney Furey as Trail Scout

References

External links
 

1926 films
1926 Western (genre) films
American black-and-white films
1920s English-language films
Film Booking Offices of America films
Films directed by Robert De Lacey
Silent American Western (genre) films
1920s American films